32 Poems Magazine (32 Poems) is a literary magazine, founded in the American states of Maryland and Texas in 2003, that has published poems from writers around the world.

About
This independent magazine, founded by Deborah Ager and John Poch, made its debut at the 2003 Associated Writing Programs Conference in Baltimore, Maryland and publishes a winter issue in November and a spring issue in April. In the beginning, 32 Poems published only poetry. Since at least the Fall of 2013 it also publishes prose. Each issue contains 32 poems for a total of 64 poems published per year.

Board members include: C. Dale Young, B.H. Fairchild, Deborah Ager, and Grace Schulman.

32 Poems is currently edited by George David Clark.

Contributors
Contributors have included: Billy Collins, Brigit Pegeen Kelly, Lydia Davis, Ricardo Pau-Llosa, A.E. Stallings, William Logan, G.C. Waldrep, Rosemary Winslow, Jeannine Hall Gailey, Chad Davidson, Paul Guest, Bob Hicok, H. L. Hix, James Hoch, Lia Purpura, Daniel Nester, Dan O'Brien, Robin Beth Schaer, Amit Majmudar, Lisa Russ Spaar, Bernadette Geyer, J.E. Pitts, Stephen Graham Jones, Lydia Davis, Katie Umans, Averill Curdy, Steven D. Schroeder, Christopher Cessac, Katie Chaple, Emily Walter, Diana Smith Bolton, Kelli Russell Agodon, Amanda Auchter, Andrea Hollander Budy, Jacqueline Kolosov, Sebastian Matthews, Daniele Pantano.

The work received positive reviews.

See also
List of literary magazines

References

External links
 32 Poems home page

Magazines established in 2003
Magazines published in Texas
Magazines published in Baltimore
Poetry magazines published in the United States